Mausala Parva is the sixteenth of eighteen books of the Hindu epic Mahabharata. It traditionally has nine chapters. The critical edition has eight chapters. It is one of three shortest books in the Mahabharata.

The Mausala Parva describes the demise of Krishna in the 36th year after the Kurukshetra war had ended, the submersion of Dvaraka under sea, death of Balarama by drowning in the sea, Vasudeva's death, and a civil war fought among the Yadava clan that killed many of them. The story of infighting of the Yadavas becomes the reason why Yudhishthira and all the Pandava brothers renounce their kingdom and begin their walk towards heaven, events recited in the last two books of the Mahabharata.

The Mausala Parva is significant for serving as a basis of archaeological studies for the Mahabharata, as well as being one of the eight Parvas found in Hindu culture of Java and Bali, Indonesia.

Structure and chapters
Mausala Parva (book) traditionally has 9 adhyayas (sections, chapters) and has no secondary sub-parvas (parts or little books). Of the 80,000 verses in the critical edition of the Mahabharata - Mausala Parva represents about 0.25% of all verses of the Epic. This makes it one of the smallest books of the Epic.

Background to Mausala Parva
Shortly after the end of the Kurukshetra war, Gandhari confronted Krishna, a meeting described in Stri Parva. In anger and grief over the death of her sons, her brothers, and of other members of the clan, Gandhari cursed Krishna that his Yadava kinsmen  too would die in a fratricidal strife.

Plot summary

The chapter begins with the announcement at the court of Pandavas that many Yadavas men were killed in an internecine war fought with clubs made of eraká grass. Yudhishthira asks for details. Mausala Parva then recites the details.

The events start near the city of Dvārakā 36 years after the end of the Kurukshetra war. The empire is peaceful and prosperous, the youth of Yadavas have become frivolous and hedonistic. Krishna's son Samba dresses up as a woman and his friends meet Rishi Vishvamitra, Durvasa, Vashista, Narada, and other rishis, who were visiting Dvaraka for an audience with Krishna. The young man playfully pretending to be a woman claims he is pregnant and asks the rishis to predict the gender of the baby.

One rishi sees through the prank. In a fit of rage, he curses Samba will give birth to an iron bolt that will destroy his entire race. The frightened youth inform Krishna what has happened, Krishna was aware of the impending destruction of Yadav as a race and didn't wish to ordain or prevent it, he summoned and reported to Krishna and Ugrasena and it was asked to pulverize the iron bolt into a powder and cast it into the Prabhasa sea and to prevent the distribution of intoxicating spirits in the kingdom.

The town then witnesses several dark omens, including the disappearance of the Sudarshana Chakra, the Panchajanya (Krishna's conch), Krishna's chariot and the plough weapon of Balarama. Pests multiply. Sinful acts multiply, yet no one feels any shame. Wives deceive their husbands, and husbands deceive their wives. Everyone has the same terrifying dreams. People insult and humiliate their seniors and teachers. Krishna asks everyone to go on a pilgrimage to the sacred waters of the Prabhasa sea. They do. When they arrive, the Yadavas revel in merrymaking, dance and drink much alcohol.

Satyaki, inebriated with wine, goes over to Kritavarma, criticizes him for scheming with Ashwatthama and killing the remaining Pandavas' army while they were sleeping (see Sauptika Parva). Pradyumna applauds Satyaki's words and disregards Kritavarma. Kritavarma in return reminds him how he cruelly slayed the unarmed Bhurishravas who, on the field of battle, sat in prayer. Krishna glances angrily at Kritavarma. They begin to argue about who did more wrong during the Kurukshetra war. In the ensuing fracas, Satyaki decapitates Kritavarma with his sword, then begins striking down others present there. Krishna runs over to prevent him from doing further mischief. However, others are impelled by fate in the face of Krishna to slay Satyaki and Pradyumna, who tries to save Satyaki. Krishna beholding his own slain son Pradyumna as well as Satyaki, takes up, in wrath, erakā grass in his hand, which miraculously becomes a bolt of iron - it is with this iron rod that he begins to slay the violent. Others try to imitate him by plucking the grass, which transforms into iron bolts in their hands due to the curse. Everyone, inebriated with alcohol, attacks everyone else. Soon everyone who is battling is dead, except for Vabhru, Daruka (Krishna's charioteer) and Krishna. Balarama survives because he withdrew from that spot before the fight. Krishna asks Daruka to go to the Pandavas, tell them what had happened and to ask Arjuna to come with help. While Daruka was gone, Krishna sends Vabhru to protect the ladies of his kingdom from robbers tempted by wealth. However, as soon as he proceeds to a distance, an iron bolt flies and impales Vabhru, killing him. Krishna goes to Dvaraka and consoles his father Vasudeva, before returning to his brother Balarama in the forest. He sees him departing from this world, giving up his life through yoga. Krishna who had the foresight of everything that had happened, concludes that the hour of his departure from this world has come. Restraining his senses, he sits in high yoga. Some of the powder cast into the Prabhasa sea had been swallowed by a fish. Inside the fish, the powder had become a metal piece. Jara, a hunter, catches that fish and finds the metal. He sharpens it to make an arrow and goes for hunting, during which, seeing red marks on Krishna's left foot, and mistaking it for a deer's eye, shoots the arrow at it. On approaching the supposed prey to capture it, he beheld Krishna rapt in Yoga, and touches his feet for being an offender. Krishna comforts him and then ascends upwards to the heavens, filling the entire welkin with splendour.

Daruka reaches to Pandavas and tells them the whole incident. Arjuna set out for seeing them. He met there Vasudeva and 500,000 people who killed each other lying there. He tells them to prepare for their leave within a week. Vasudeva dies the next day while he is meditating, while his wives join him in a funeral pyre. Then Arjuna made rites who died there, according to their order of seniority. With Yadavas old men, women and children who are the only survivors, including the 16,000  devotees (women who were saved by Krishna, from Narakaasura.) of Krishna, together set off for Indraprastha. As they are leaving, waters rise, Dvaraka sinks into the sea. Arjuna proceeded by slow marches, causing the Vrishni women to rest in pleasant forests, mountains and by the sides of delightful streams. Arrived at the country of five waters, they made an encampment there. Robbers overwhelmed by cupidity and temptation attacks them, seeing them being protected by only one bowman. The son of Kunti, ceasing turned, with his followers, towards the place where robbers attacked. Smiling the while, Arjuna addresses them but they disregarded his words, fell upon him. With great difficulty, he succeeded in activating his bow. When the battle had become furious, he tries to invoke his celestial weapons, which did not appear at his bidding. The concourse was very large, the robbers assailed it at different points, Arjuna tries his best to protect it, but fails. In his very sight, ladies were dragged away, while some went away with robbers of their own accord, when they found none to save them. Supported by servants, Arjuna struck the robbers with his shafts sped from Gandiva, but soon however his inexhaustible quivers were out of shafts. Then afflicted with grief, he tries to fight with his bow, but until that time those robbers had retreated, taking ladies away with them. Dhananjaya regarded it all as the work of destiny, while thinking of his non-appearance of celestial weapons, refusal of his bow to obey him; and exhaustion of his shafts. Taking with him the remnant of the Vrishni women, and the wealth that was still with them, reached Kurukshetra. He installs warriors at different positions at different locations. Rukmini, Saivaya, Haimavatu, and Jambavati, ascended the funeral pyre. Satyabhama and others entered the woods to practice penances.

Arjuna becomes depressed and full of doubts about his warrior abilities. He approaches Vyasa, and explains how he feels for failing those that depended on him for their safety and security. Sage Vyasa explains that it was the destiny of those warriors, Krishna suffered it too, although he was competent to baffle the curses, Arjuna and his brothers have served the purpose of their lives, those weapons with which he achieved success no longer needs him, and had gone to the place from where they came from. So it is time for them to retire and renounce their kingdom. Arjuna takes leave of Vyasa, meets with Yudhishthira and tells them what had happened.

English translations
Mausala Parva was composed in Sanskrit. Several translations in English are available. Two translations from 19th century, now in public domain, are those by Kisari Mohan Ganguli and Manmatha Nath Dutt. The translations vary with each translator's interpretations.

Debroy, in 2011, notes that updated critical edition of Mausala Parva, after removing verses generally accepted so far as spurious and inserted into the original, has 9 adhyayas (chapters) and 273 shlokas (verses).

Significance

Archaeological studies on the Mahabharata
The details in Mausala Parva have served as a source for scholarly studies on whether the Mahabharata is entirely fictional, or it is partly based on an ancient war in India. The chapters in Mausala Parva that describe Dwarka, its submergence in the Prabhasa sea, and others books of the Mahabharata have attracted the attention of scholars. It has led to the hypothesis that if any city named Dwarka existed in ancient India, it is likely to have been in the modern state of Gujarat or Maharashtra. With funding from the Government of India, the Archaeological Survey of India and National Institute of Oceanography conducted various studies since 1955, particularly since late 1970s. These studies found remnants of various temples in Gujarat, variously dated to be from 9th century, 1st century and 1st millennium BC. The studies have also found ceramic artifacts, votive jars with inscriptions praising the sea god at Bet Dwarka (island near Dwarka, Gujarat). These have been dated to be between 500 BC and 1500 BC. 
Archaeological investigations at Dwarka, both on shore and offshore in the Arabian Sea, have been conducted by the Archaeological Survey of India. The first investigations carried out on land in 1963 revealed many artifacts. The objective of the investigations conducted by the Marine Archaeology Unit of the National Institute of Oceanography and the Government of Gujarat was to reconstruct the history of maritime trade, shipbuilding and cultural status of ancient city of Dwarka of the prehistoric times. Excavations done at two sites on the seaward side of Dwarka brought to light submerged settlements, stone-built jetty of large size and triangular stone anchors with three holes. The settlements are in the form of exterior and interior walls, and fort bastions.

Chronology and spread of the Epic
Mausala Parva is one of the eight books that were discovered in parts of Indonesia. In islands of Indonesia, Dutch colonial officials discovered the Epic to consist of only eight books, instead of eighteen. It is unclear if this implies the original Epic had only eight books as and when it arrived in Indonesia, or some books were lost as the Epic spread in Southeast Asia. D. Van Hinloopen Labberton reports the eight parvas as: Adi, Virata, Udyoga, Bhixma, Ashramardtm, Mausala, Prasthdnika and Svargarohana.

See also
Previous book of Mahabharata: Ashramavasika  Parva
Next book of Mahabharata: Mahaprasthanika  Parva

References

External links
 Mausala Parva, English Translation by Kisari Mohan Ganguli
 Mausala Parva, English Translation by Manmatha Nath Dutt
 Mausala Parva in Sanskrit by Vyasadeva with commentary by Nilakantha - Worldcat OCLC link
 Mousala Parva in Sanskrit and Hindi by Ramnarayandutt Shastri, Volume 5

Parvas in Mahabharata